Area code 925 is a telephone area code that was split from area code 510 in the U.S. state of California, on March 14, 1998. It covers the inland portions of the East Bay counties of Alameda and Contra Costa in the northern area of California.

The area was originally part of area code 415, one of the first three area codes created in California in 1947, which originally covered all of central California. In 1991, area code 510 was created to encompass most of the East Bay.  Area code 925 was created March 14, 1998, when area code 510 was split along the natural border of the Berkeley Hills.

The area code includes southeastern Alameda County (Dublin, Pleasanton, Livermore, Sunol, and unincorporated areas surrounding those communities), and all of Contra Costa County except the western part (El Cerrito to Crockett).

Prior to October 2021, area code 925 had telephone numbers assigned for the central office code 988. In 2020, 988 was designated nationwide as a dialing code for the National Suicide Prevention Lifeline, which created a conflict for exchanges that permit seven-digit dialing. The area code was therefore transitioned to ten-digit dialing on October 24, 2021.

Cities in the 925 area code

Alameda County

Altamont
Dougherty
Dublin
East Pleasanton
Kilkare Woods
Livermore
Pleasanton
San Ramon Village
Sunol
Ulmar

Contra Costa County

Alamo
Alamo Oaks
Antioch
Bay Point
Bethel Island
Bixler
Blackhawk
Blackhawk-Camino Tassajara
Brentwood
Byron
Canyon
Clayton
Clyde
Concord
Danville
Diablo
Discovery Bay
Knightsen
Lafayette
Marsh Creek Springs
Martinez
Mococo
Moraga
Norris Canyon
Oakley
Orinda
Orwood
Pacheco
Pittsburg
Pleasant Hill
San Ramon
Saranap
Shore Acres
Vine Hill
Waldon
Walnut Creek

See also
List of California area codes

References

External links

Report on the 925 area code produced by the California Public Utilities Commission, Telecommunications Division
 List of exchanges from AreaCodeDownload.com, 925 Area Code

925
Alameda County, California
Contra Costa County, California
925
Northern California